"Kuando el rey Nimrod" (קואנדו אל ריי נמרוד, or  modern Spanish spelling: Cuando el Rey Nimrod; "When King Nimrod") is a Sephardic folk song. It is sung in the Judaeo-Spanish language and tells the story of the birth of Abraham, the father of the Jewish people and of monotheism.

History
In contrast to a popular misconception, "Kuando el rey Nimrod" is not a song that dates from the times when the Jews lived in Spain and Portugal in the Middle Ages, and has its roots in a piyyut called La vocación de Abraham, of which several versions have been found that date from the 18th century and were written by anonymous authors in the former Ottoman Empire. The song, with its original much longer lyrics and its makam-based structure, would become popular in the Sephardic communities of the Mediterranean basin. Around the year 1890, an anonymous author from Tangiers, Morocco wrote a different version of the song, shortening its lyrics and composing a new melody in maqam Hejaz. This reduced and catchier version survived to our days to become arguably the most popular song in the Sephardic repertoire, becoming a staple for Ladino singers such as Yehoram Gaon and Fortuna, and even for some Klezmer bands whenever they want to include a Sephardic song into their repertoire.

Interpretations
Anachronistically, Abraham — who in the Bible is the very first Jew and the ancestor of all who followed, hence his appellation "Avinu" (Our Father)—is in the Judaeo-Spanish song already born, in the juderia (modern Spanish: judería, Judaeo-Spanish: djudería), the Jewish quarter. Abraham became the first Jew by acknowledging the existence of one God. Abraham in the Bible is the very first man to be circumcised and perform circumcision.

Much of this story is based on the account of Abraham's life written in the book "Maaseh Avraham Avinu Alav HaShalom" as well as the Midrash regarding the furnace and Zohar concerning Elijah the Prophet.

Lyrics

References

Jewish folk songs
Judaeo-Spanish-language songs
Cultural depictions of Abraham
Nimrod